

 Aldinga Reef Aquatic Reserve is a marine protected area in the Australian state of South Australia located in waters adjoining the east coast of Gulf St Vincent including land within the intertidal zone in the suburbs of  Aldinga Beach and Port Willunga about  south of the state capital of Adelaide.

It was declared on 30 November 1971 to protect ‘aquatic plants and animals associated with the large intertidal limestone reef and the spectacular precipitous underwater cliff known as the ‘drop-off’ and the surrounding sandy substrate for the purposes of education and recreation’.  ‘Fishing and collecting or removing any marine organism is prohibited’, however the following activities are permitted - use of boats, swimming, snorkelling, scuba diving and walking on intertidal reef exposed at low water.  The reserve extends seaward a distance of about  around a headland named Snapper Point from Thomas Street, Aldinga Beach in the south and Seaborne Avenue, Port Willunga in the north.

Since 2012, it has been located within the boundaries of a “sanctuary zone” within the Encounter Marine Park.

The aquatic reserve is classified as an IUCN Category II protected area.

See also
Protected areas of South Australia
List of protected areas in Adelaide

References

External links
Webpage for Aldinga Reef Aquatic Reserve on the Protected Planet website

Aquatic reserves of South Australia
Protected areas in Adelaide
Protected areas established in 1971  
1971 establishments in Australia
Gulf St Vincent